Ismaridae is a family of insects belonging to the order Hymenoptera. About 50 species are known in this small relictual group; all the species for which the biology is known appear to be hyperparasitoids that parasitize Dryinidae (that attack leafhoppers).

This lineage was formerly included in the family Diapriidae, as the subfamily Ismarinae, but differ from diapriid wasps by lacking a facial projection from which the antenna arise, and characterized by various degrees of fusion of the metasomal terga. The family historically included only two genera, Ismarus and Szelenyioprioides, though the latter genus was recently synonymized with the diapriid genus Spilomicrus, thereby restricting the family to solely Ismarus.

References

Parasitica
Apocrita families
Monogeneric insect families